01.10 is the fifth and last studio album by Canadian rapper K.Maro, a French language album released as a follow-up to his English language album Perfect Stranger. 01.10 denotes to January 2010.

The album was released on April 26, 2010. and there was a launching concert at Montreal's Olympia theatre with proceeds going to the Centre hospitalier universitaire Sainte-Justine, a major children's hospital.

Two singles have been released from the album, "Elektric" and "Music". K.Maro collaborated with K.Pone.Inc artist Shy'm on "L'un pour l'autre"

Track listing
"Music"
"Génération 80's"
"Elektric"
"Belle trentaine"
"L'un pour l'autre" (featuring Shy'm)
"Clash"
"La cour des malaimés"
"C'est pas grave"
"Pas 2 comme toi"
"Ambitieux"
"Rien n'a changé"
"Envers et contre tout"
"Réversible"
"L'essentiel"

References

2010 albums
K.Maro albums
French-language albums